Big Mess is the third studio album by the indie rock band Grouplove. It was released on September 9, 2016, and later re-released to iTunes and Spotify on August 17, 2017, with a new track titled "Remember That Night". The track was released as a single the same day.

Personnel 

 Christian Zucconi – lead vocals, rhythm guitar, piano
 Hannah Hooper – lead vocals, percussion, keyboards
 Andrew Wessen – lead guitar, backing vocals, vocals on "Cannonball” 
 Daniel Gleason  – bass guitar
 Ryan Rabin – drums, producer

Track listing

Charts

References

Grouplove albums
2016 albums